The Lennon Wall or John Lennon Wall is a wall in Prague, Czech Republic. Since the 1980s, this once-typical wall has been filled with John Lennon–inspired graffiti, lyrics from Beatles' songs, and designs relating to local and global causes.

History and ongoing development
Located in a small and secluded square across from the French Embassy, the wall had been decorated by love poems and short messages against the regime since 1960s. It received its first decoration connected to John Lennon—a symbol of freedom, western culture, and political struggle—following the 1980 assassination of John Lennon when an unknown artist painted a single image of the singer-songwriter and some lyrics.

In 1988, the wall was a source of irritation for Gustáv Husák's communist regime. Following a short-lived era of democratization and political liberalization known as the Prague Spring, the newly-installed communist government dismantled the reforms, inspiring anger and resistance. Young Czechs wrote their grievances on the wall and, according to a report of the time, this led to a clash between hundreds of students and security police on the nearby Charles Bridge. The liberalization movement these students followed was described as Lennonism (not to be confused with Leninism), and Czech authorities described participants variously as alcoholic, mentally deranged, sociopathic, and agents of Western free market capitalism.

The wall continuously undergoes change, and the original portrait of Lennon is long lost under layers of new paint. Even when the wall was repainted by authorities, by the next day it was again full of poems and flowers. Today, the wall represents a symbol of global ideals such as love and peace.

The wall is owned by the Sovereign Military Order of Malta, which allowed the graffiti, and is located at Velkopřevorské náměstí (Grand Priory Square), Malá Strana.

On 17 November 2014, the 25th anniversary of the Velvet Revolution, the wall was painted over in pure white by a group of art students, leaving only the text “wall is over” . The Knights of Malta initially filed a criminal complaint for vandalism against the students, which they later retracted after contacting them.
The wall mural is still there as of 23 July 2017. And the “Wall is Over” bit has been changed to “War Is Over” from the song Happy Xmas (War Is Over).

On 22 April 2019, Earth Day, the action group Extinction Rebellion repainted the entire wall with slogans demanding action from the Czech government on climate change. “KLIMATICKÁ NOUZE” was painted in large block print letters, which reads “climate emergency” in Czech. Members of the public were encouraged to add their own messages during the process, resulting in calls for action painted in several languages. A giant image of a skull was also painted. The repaint was carried out in a manner which allowed some of the existing artwork to be included on the new wall.

In July 2019, artists painted a memorial on the wall for Hong Kong democracy activist Marco Leung Ling-kit, who became known as a martyr and a symbol of hope for the 2019 anti-extradition bill protest movement. The image on the wall depicts the yellow raincoat he was wearing during the banner drop that eventually led to a fall from the building, along with some words of solidarity: “Hong Kong, Add oil.”

On 4 August 2019, it was reported that the wall will be put under CCTV surveillance to block unlawful graffiti and combat the swaths of tourists that pass by it every day.

In October 2019, the Sovereign Military Order of Malta together with Prague 1 started the reconstruction of the Lennon Wall which lasted until November. They reacted thus to the recent situation of vandalism on the wall and its surroundings connected to the overtourism which became unbearable this summer. The place should have regained its respectable form which was going to be introduced on the occasion of the 30th anniversary of the Velvet Revolution in November as an open-air gallery with new rules. On 7 November 2019, the new face of the Lennon Wall as an open-air gallery was created and introduced to the public. Over 30 Czech and foreign professional artists gathered by the Czech designer Pavel Šťastný painted the Wall. New rules of the Wall no longer allow spraying, people can leave their messages connected to freedom and love only in the white free zones andy in more sensitive materials than sprays, e.g. pencil, marker, or chalk. Cameras and police monitor the wall to ensure the artistic portion is not defaced.

In July 2021, a new museum about the history of the Lennon Wall, the Lennon Wall Story, was set in Prokopska Street 8 in the cool underground. The Lennon Wall Story is a new museum that tracks the history and art of one of Prague’s major attractions. Located just a few hundred metres from the famous Lennon Wall itself, the museum seeks to entice visitors with dozens of photos, historic objects, Beatles memorabilia and a half hour documentary about the history of the wall, known for political and artistic expression.

Lennon Walls in Hong Kong

During the 2014 democracy protests in Hong Kong, a similar Lennon Wall appeared along the staircase outside of the Hong Kong Central Government Offices. Inspired by the original in Prague, many thousands of people posted colourful post-it notes expressing democratic wishes for Hong Kong. The wall was one of the major arts of the Umbrella Movement. Throughout several months of occupations and protest, many efforts were made by different groups to ensure physical and digital preservation of the Hong Kong Lennon Wall.

Five years later, during the 2019–20 Hong Kong protests, the same wall was created again, with new post-it notes. Within days, dozens of post-it note Lennon Walls had “blossomed everywhere” (遍地開花) throughout Hong Kong, including on Hong Kong Island itself, Kowloon, the New Territories, and on the many outlying islands. There are even some Lennon Walls located inside government offices, including RTHK and the Policy Innovation and Co-ordination Office. According to a crowd-sourced map of Hong Kong, there are over 150 Lennon Walls throughout the region.

On 21 September 2019, police in Hong Kong began tearing down Lennon Walls across the city to remove anti-government statements.

Lennon Walls have also appeared outside of Hong Kong in Toronto, Vancouver BC, Calgary, Seoul, Tokyo, Berlin, London, Sydney, Manchester, Melbourne, Taipei, and Auckland.

See also

 John Lennon Park — Havana, Cuba
 Strawberry Fields — Memorial in Central Park NYC
 Tsoi Wall — a similar wall near Arbat Street in Moscow
 Lennon Walls of Hong Kong
 Art of the Umbrella Movement
 2019–20 Hong Kong protests
 Extinction Rebellion
 List of famous walls

References

External links

 Digital Lennon Wall
 Google Maps location of John Lennon Wall
 Article about the Lennon Wall in the Erasmuspc World CityPoem collection
 Book of Lennon Wall

 
Cultural depictions of John Lennon
Buildings and structures in Prague
Culture in Prague
Graffiti and unauthorised signage
Tourist attractions in Prague
Walls
Malá Strana